Antonio Marín (with diacritic) or Antonio Marin (no diacritic) may refer to:

 Antonio Marín (bobsleigh) (born 1945), Spanish bobsledder
 Antonio Marín Muñoz (born 1970), Spanish writer and historian
 Antonio Marín (footballer, born 1996), Spanish footballer
 Antonio Marin (footballer, born 2001), Croatian footballer